El Salto is a rock climbing area in the Mexican state of Nuevo León, in Northeastern Mexico. The climbing area is near to Ciénega de González village, Santiago municipality, 60 km away from Monterrey. El Salto is one of the few climbing areas in northern Mexico where overhanging limestone full of tufa can be found. Only All-wheel drive  vehicles are able to get into the area. Las Animas wall can be reached by foot in about 20 minutes. The name “El Salto” refers to a waterfall near the climbing area.

Climbing features
 Las Animas, with grades from 5.11B to 5.13d.
 La Cueva del Tecolote, with Grades from 5.11C to 5.14B.

External links
 Fotografias el Salto
Climbelsalto.com
Climbing areas of Nuevo León